Eero Peltonen (born 22 December 1986) is a football striker. He played for MyPa of the Veikkausliiga until 2008. Currently Eero Peltonen is playing for IFK Helsinki in the Finnish Premier League (Veikkausliiga).

He began his career in PK-35 of the Ykkönen, the second tier of Finnish football, before signing for Crystal Palace of The Championship, a second-tier English team. After a season in England, Peltonen moved back to his homeland, to MyPa.

References

1986 births
Living people
Association football forwards
Finnish footballers
Veikkausliiga players
Crystal Palace F.C. players
Myllykosken Pallo −47 players
HIFK Fotboll players